MV Bni Nsar, (formerly MV Akashi, MV Dame M, MV Marrakech Express) was a ferry launched on 28 August 1972 in Japan. She was scrapped in 2014 under the name Sar.

History 

The MV Bni Nsar was built in Japan in 1972. She was put in service under the name of MV Akashi. In 1991, she was sold to Greek owner Marlines. She was rebuilt at Perama under the name MV Dame M. When she re-entered service she was used between Ancona and Patras.

In 1996, she was operated by Comanav in Morocco and then was returned to Greece. In 1999, she was bought by Comanav and was renamed Salamis Star for service in Greece. In 2002, she was returned to Morocco operations, becoming Marrakech Express. She was operated on the Sète - Nador route.

In 2010, she was renamed Bni Nsar and flagged in Panama.

She was scrapped at Aliaga on 31 July 2014 under the name Sar.

References

External links

1972 ships
Ships built in Japan
Ferries